Coremia is a genus of beetles in the family Cerambycidae, containing the following species:

 Coremia plumipes (Pallas, 1772)
 Coremia signaticollis Buquet in Guérin-Méneville, 1844

References

Rhopalophorini